Caroline Sheen is a Welsh actress who has played leading roles on stage in the West End alongside TV and film appearances. She won a Helen Hayes award for playing the role of Mary Poppins on the National Tour of America.

Background
Born and raised in South Wales, Sheen is married to actor Michael Jibson. A member of the National Youth Theatre of Wales and Gwent Young People's Theatre, she was named as an Associate Artist of the Watermill Theatre in 2018. Sheen is also an Honorary Fellow of the University of South Wales.

Career
Sheen made her West End debut as Marty in Grease at the Cambridge Theatre. She went on to play Florinda in Into the Woods at the Donmar Warehouse and then went into the original cast of Mamma Mia! at the Prince Edward Theatre, understudying the lead role of Sophie. She created the role of Jennifer Gabriel in the world premiere production of The Witches of Eastwick at the Theatre Royal Drury Lane. Other West End credits include Eponine in Les Misérables at the Palace Theatre, Sandy in Grease at the Victoria Palace, and Truly Scrumptious in Chitty Chitty Bang Bang at the London Palladium 
Work at the National Theatre includes Philia in A Funny Thing Happened on the Way to the Forum', Susan Walker in Once in a Lifetime
Caroline played Mary Poppins in the UK Tour of the Cameron Mackintosh/Disney production. Caroline created the role of Clara Johnson in the European Premiere of The Light in the Piazza at Curve Theatre in Leicester. Sheen reprised her role as Mary Poppins in the US Tour of Mary Poppins. She returned to the UK in the role of Fantine in Les Misérables at the Queens Theatre, following that with Woman 2 in the London Premiere of Stephen Sondheim's Putting it Together at the St James Theatre. Sheen stepped in at last minute to play the roles of Alaura/Carla on several occasions in the Donmar Warehouse production of City of Angels. More recent work includes leading roles in Crazy for You and Under Milk Wood both at the Watermill Theatre, and Lilli/Kate in Kiss Me Kate at Kilworth House. In 2019, Sheen created the leading role of Violet Newstead in the West End Premiere of 9 to 5 at the Savoy Theatre. She left the role on 8 February 2020. During the 2020 pandemic, Sheen and her husband Michael Jibson played opposite each other as  Guinevere and Arthur in an outdoor production of Camelot back at the Watermill Theatre

TV work includes  Hotel Babylon, Doctors  and Torchwood. Queen Elizabeth of York in the Channel 4 documentary Henry VIII, Mind of a Tyrant. In 2018, Sheen appeared in episodes of Press and The Rook, and starred in the leading role of Carys in Pitching In for the BBC. In 2021 she appeared as DI Meredith Hughes in Silent Witness. In 2022 she appeared as Claire in series 4 of Ghosts. 

Film work includes Les Miserables (2012), Nativity Rocks and Four Kids and It (2020).

Recordings
In February 2010 Caroline released her debut album Raise the Curtain, a selection of songs by leading contemporary musical theatre writers from Britain and America; featuring 5 previously unrecorded songs, including a cut song from The Witches of Eastwick; alongside songs from The Light in the Piazza, Just So, Grey Gardens, and Mary Poppins.
Sheen can also be heard on the original cast recordings of Mamma Mia!, The Witches of Eastwick, Rosemary Ashe's album Serious Cabaret and A Spoonful of Stiles and Drewe.
In 2016 Before/After was released, a recording of a new musical featuring Sheen and Hadley Fraser.
In 2020 the 9 to 5: The Musical London cast album was released in which she features as Violet Newstead, the role she created in London.

Other performances
Sheen was a guest soloist in the opening ceremony of the Wales Millennium Centre. Other solo concert work includes Night of a Thousand Voices at the Royal Albert Hall, Michael Ball and Friends at the Royal Opera House, An Evening with Jason Robert Brown, and Georgia Stitt and Friends. She appeared alongside fellow Mary Poppins actresses Lisa O'Hare and Scarlett Strallen in A Spoonful of Stiles and Drewe singing a specially devised version of "Practically Perfect".

On 9 February 2020 she interviewed Stephen Schwartz at the JW3 in London.

References

External links

Caroline's official Website
An interview with Caroline Sheen
An interview with Caroline Sheen regarding her debut album 'Raise the Curtain' – Feb.2010

Alumni of the Guildford School of Acting
Welsh musical theatre actresses
Welsh television actresses
1974 births
Living people
People from Caerleon